Ludworth is a name for the following settlements in the United Kingdom:

Ludworth, County Durham
Ludworth, Greater Manchester (historically in Derbyshire, after 1936 in Cheshire)